Uhligites is an oppeliid ammonite included in the subfamily Streblitinae
that lived during the latest part of the Jurassic and earliest Cretaceous; from about 150  to 140 m.y.a.

Uhligites has been found in uppermost Jurassic (Tithonian) sediments in China, India, New Zealand, and Yemen, and the Lower Cretaceous (Berriasian) sediments, also in Yemen, and in Antarctica.

Related genera include Streblites, Substreblites, and Cyrtosiceras.

References
 Uhligites-Paleodb
 Arkell et al.'', 1957. Mesozoic Ammonoidea; Treatise on Invertebrate Paleontology, Part L,  Geological Society of America.
 D.T, Donovan, Collomon, J.H, and Howarth, M.K 1981. Classification of the Jurassic Ammonitina. The Ammmonoidea; Systematics Association.

Ammonitida genera
Oppeliidae
Tithonian first appearances
Early Cretaceous genus extinctions
Cretaceous animals of Asia